The Dino 206 GT,  246 GT and 246 GTS are V6 mid-engined sports cars produced by Ferrari and sold under the Dino marque between 1967 and 1974.

The Dino 246 was the first automobile manufactured by Ferrari in high numbers. It is lauded by many for its intrinsic driving qualities and groundbreaking design. In 2004, Sports Car International placed the car at number six on its list of Top Sports Cars of the 1970s. Motor Trend Classic placed the 206/246 at number seven in their list of the 10 "Greatest Ferraris of all time".

Dino 206 GT

The production Dino 206 GT was designed by Aldo Brovarone and Leonardo Fioravanti at Pininfarina and built by Scaglietti. It had the soft edges and curving lines typical of earlier Italian cars, unlike its angular successor, the 308 GT4. It was named after Enzo Ferrari's late son Alfredo who was affectionately known as Dino to his family.

The 206 GT used a transverse-mounted 2.0 litre all-aluminium, 65-degree V6 engine with dual overhead camshafts and a 9:1 compression ratio, making  at the 8,000 rpm redline. The crankshaft featured four main bearings. Induction was via three Weber 40 DCN/4 2-barrel carburetors. The 206 GT was the first car sold by Ferrari which used an electronic ignition, a Dinoplex C capacitive discharge ignition system that was developed by Magneti Marelli for the high revving Dino V6 engine. It was also the first Ferrari product to have a direct rack-and-pinion steering.

The 206 GT frame featured a light-weight, aluminium body, full independent suspension, and all round disc brakes.

152 were built in total between 1967 and 1969, in left hand drive only.

The same  engine was used in the Fiat Dino Coupe and Spider, produced during the same period. The conversion of the Dino 206 SP/S twin-cam racing engine for road-going use in the Dino (and the two Fiat models) was entrusted by Fiat to Aurelio Lampredi, to whom Ferrari owed so many great engines. Lampredi, interviewed in the early 1980s (he died in 1989 at the age of 71), noted that, "Things didn't work out exactly as Ferrari had foreseen." 

Fiat quoted  DIN for the Fiat Dino and Coupé, and in 1967 Ferrari - presenting the first prototype of the Dino 206 GT - claimed . This, however, was not the case. Both engines were made by Fiat workers in Turin on the same production line, without any discrimination as to their destination, and all were identical. 

Later Fiat Dinos also used the 2.4L engine, although significantly fewer were produced with this engine.

Dino 246 GT and GTS

Calls for more power were answered with the  Dino 65° V6 engine, DOHC, 2 valves per cylinder, 9.0:1 compression ratio, iron block with alloy heads. The GT had 3X2-barrel 40 DCNF/6 or 40 DCNF/7 Weber carburetors. For the 246 a new version of the Dinoplex ignition was deployed, the more compact Magneti Marelli AEC103A system.

The body was now mostly made of steel to save cost. The new car had a revised interior. Other differences were 2 rows of 7 vents on the slightly longer engine lid of the 246 instead of 6 and a fuel cap flap cover instead of the exposed one of the 206.

Dino 246 production numbered 2,295 GT coupés and 1,274 GTS spyders, the latter being built after the Series III revision from 1972 to 1974 only, for a total production run of 3,569 cars. Three series of the Dino were built, with differences in wheels, windshield wiper coverage, and engine ventilation. The Series I cars (also known as L series), 357 of which were built until the summer of 1970, used the same center-bolt wheels and "clapping hands" windscreen wipers as did the 206. Series II cars (M series, built until July 1971 in 507 examples) received five-bolt Cromodora alloys and parallel moving wipers. The Series III cars (E series) had minor differences in gearing and fuel supply, and were built at a much higher rate as sales in the United States commenced with this version. 1,431 Series III GT coupés and 1,274 GTS removable top cars were built.

With a  acceleration time of 5.5 seconds the Dino narrowly outperformed the Porsche again, although the Porsche was narrowly the winner on fuel economy. The manufacturer's recommended UK retail price of £5,485 was higher than the £5,211 asked for the Porsche. For comparison, the much larger, four-passenger Citroën SM high-performance luxury coupe sold for £4,700.

In a famous incident, a Dino 246 GTS was discovered in Los Angeles dig out by children in 1978, buried in a yard. The car was later revealed to be the victim of an elaborate insurance fraud perpetrated by the owner.

The Dino's 2.4 L V6 was also used in the Fiat Dino 2400 and the Lancia Stratos rally car.

There were some minor differences in trim for various markets, the most obvious being marker lights on US market Dinos. Group 4-style flared wheelarches were optional, as were seats from the 365 GTB/4 Daytona, the pair often ordered in conjunction with wide, sand-cast Campagnolo alloy wheels.

References

Bibliography

External links

Dino Register
Club Dino Italia Ferrari, Fiat, Lancia Stratos
Dino UK Ferrari, Fiat, Lancia Stratos

Pininfarina
Ferrari vehicles
Rear mid-engine, rear-wheel-drive vehicles
Cars introduced in 1968
Cars introduced in 1969